Serenus Johnson Construction is a commercial construction company based in Bay City, Michigan. The company was founded in 1919 by a Finnish immigrant, Serenus Johnson.

Overview
A full service construction provider, the company offers a variety of delivery systems, such as Design/Build,
construction management, and competitive bid. Projects range from new buildings to additions
to remodels. The company works in markets including health care, corporate offices, financial, education, industrial, retail, religious,
governmental and agricultural.

History
Serenus Johnson arrived to the United States in 1912 at the age of 17, following in the footsteps of his sister and five brothers who preceded him to America. Soon after his arrival he joined his brothers working on the freighters that sailed the Great Lakes. When his new country became involved in World War I, Serenus took a job as a riveter in a plant that was building boats for the war effort.
In 1919, he founded his construction company, providing various general contracting
services in the Bay City area.

The construction company weathered the Great Depression, growing from Bay City to the surrounding communities. The material and labor shortages of World War II were difficult on the construction business, but the end of the war started a building boom across America, including Mid-Michigan. The company benefited from this and built many schools and churches during the late 1940s and 1950s. When the youngest son, Raymond, joined the company, Serenus Johnson proudly added, “and Son” to its name. Serenus had four brothers and a son-in-law that worked for him over the many years, with both the son-in-law and one brother staying with the company until their retirements.
As the 1960s began, the company continued to grow by offering different types of construction, expanding into other communities and working with new markets. Serenus retired in 1962 and Raymond continued to operate the company until he retired in 1996. Tom Johnson, Raymond’s son, joined the company in 1982 and served as President until 2015. He currently serves as the C.E.O. at Serenus Johnson. In the fall of 2015, long time employee, Bill Woolwine, Jr. became the owner and President of Serenus Johnson Construction.  

Tom Johnson also teamed with his brother Brian to form Serenus Johnson Portables, which manufactures portable, modular buildings.

The company is now named Serenus Johnson Construction.

Memberships
Associated General Contractors of America
Bay Area Chamber of Commerce

Community involvement
Bay City State Theatre
Chemical Bank
Bay Arenac Intermediate School District
Leadership Bay County
Bay City Rotary Club
ENERGIZE Bay Area Young Professionals
Bay Area Chamber of Commerce
Helen M. Nickless Volunteer Clinic

References

External links
Serenus Johnson Construction Home Page 
 http://www.serenusjohnson.com

Companies based in Michigan